IBSS may refer to:

 International Bibliography of the Social Sciences
 Independent basic service set, in wireless computer networking
 International Business School of Scandinavia, a business school in Denmark
 International Business School Suzhou, the Xi'an Jiaotong-Liverpool University business school in Suzhou, China